Callinectes marginatus, known as the "Sharptooth swimcrab" or "Marbled swimcrab", is a species of swimming crab in the genus Callinectes.

Description

Distribution and ecology
Although the name Callinectes marginatus was used by Mary J. Rathbun and others to also cover animals now referred to the species C. larvatus and C. diacanthus, C. marginatus is now used only for a species found from the Cape Verde Islands and Nouadhibou, Mauritania to Angola.

C. marginatus appears to be entirely marine, unlike some of its congeners, although there are records from the estuaries of the Congo River and the Hwini River.

References

Portunoidea
Crustaceans of the Atlantic Ocean
Crustaceans described in 1861